This is a list of the first minority male lawyer(s) and judge(s) in North Dakota. It includes the year in which the men were admitted to practice law (in parentheses). Also included are those who achieved other distinctions, such becoming the first in their state to graduate from law school or become a political figure.

Firsts in North Dakota's history

Lawyers 
In 1900, the first African American male attorney was listed in the census. However, it is uncertain who that person is.

Hans C. Walker, Jr. (1960): One of the first Native American (Hidatsa) male lawyers in North Dakota

Federal judges 

 First Jewish American male (Court of Appeals for the Eighth Circuit): Myron H. Bright (1947) in 1968

See also 

 List of first minority male lawyers and judges in the United States

Other topics of interest 

 List of first women lawyers and judges in the United States
 List of first women lawyers and judges in North Dakota

References 

 
Minority, North Dakota, first
Minority, North Dakota, first
Legal history of North Dakota
Lists of people from North Dakota
North Dakota lawyers